Britta Elsert Gynning (born 5 December 1995) is a Swedish former footballer who played as a goalkeeper.

External links 
 
  (archive)
 

1995 births
Living people
Swedish women's footballers
AIK Fotboll (women) players
Eskilstuna United DFF players
Hammarby Fotboll (women) players
Damallsvenskan players
Women's association football goalkeepers